Ukrainian cinema comprises the art of film and creative movies made within the nation of Ukraine and also by Ukrainian film makers abroad. 

Despite a history of important and successful productions, the industry has often been characterized by a debate about its identity, the level of Russian and European influence. Ukrainian producers are active in international co-productions, while Ukrainian actors, directors and crew feature regularly in Russian (and formerly Soviet) films. Successful films have been based on Ukrainian people, stories or events, including Battleship Potemkin, Man with a Movie Camera, and Everything Is Illuminated.

The Ukrainian State Film Agency owns National Oleksandr Dovzhenko Film Centre, film copying laboratory and archive, and takes part in hosting of the Odesa International Film Festival. Another festival, Molodist in Kyiv, is the only FIAPF accredited International Film Festival held in Ukraine; the competition program has sections for student films, first short films, and first full feature films from all over the world. It is held during the month of October every year.

Ukraine has had an influence on the history of the cinema. Ukrainian directors Alexander Dovzhenko, often cited as one of the most important early Soviet filmmakers, as well as being a pioneer of Soviet montage theory, Dovzhenko Film Studios, and Sergei Parajanov, Armenian film director and artist who made significant contributions to Ukrainian, Armenian and Georgian cinema. He invented his own cinematic style, Ukrainian poetic cinema, which was totally out of step with the guiding principles of socialist realism.

Other important directors including Kira Muratova, Sergei Loznitsa, Myroslav Slaboshpytskyi, Larisa Shepitko, Sergei Bondarchuk, Leonid Bykov, Yuri Ilyenko, Leonid Osyka, Ihor Podolchak with his Delirium and Maryna Vroda. Many Ukrainian actors have achieved international fame and critical success, including: Vera Kholodnaya, Bohdan Stupka, Eugene Hütz, Milla Jovovich, Olga Kurylenko, Mila Kunis, Mark Ivanir.

History of the cinema in Ukraine

On the territory of Odesa Film Studio, there is a Museum of the Cinema, in which you can discover many interesting facts on the history of the cinema in general and history of Ukrainian cinema as a part. Here you can find historic materials, from the invention of cinema, to the postmodern, digital and avant-garde.

Films of Ukrainian SSR by ticket sales

Notable film directors and actors

Prominent Ukrainian directors include Oleksandr Dovzhenko, Dziga Vertov and Serhiy Paradzhanov. Dovzhenko is often cited as one of the most important early Soviet filmmakers, as well as being a pioneer of Soviet montage theory and founding Dovzhenko Film Studios. In 1927, Dziga Vertov moved from Moscow to Ukraine. At the film studio VUFKU he made several avant-garde documentaries, among them The Eleventh Year, Man with a Movie Camera and first Ukrainian documentary sound film Enthusiasm (Symphony of the Donbass). Paradzhanov was an Armenian film director and artist who made significant contributions to Ukrainian, Armenian and Georgian cinema; he invented his own cinematic style, Ukrainian poetic cinema, which was totally out of step with the guiding principles of socialist realism. Many actors of Ukrainian origin have achieved international fame and critical success, including Vira Kholodna, Bohdan Stupka, Sergei Makovetsky, Mike Mazurki, Natalie Wood, Danny Kaye, Jack Palance, Milla Jovovich, Olga Kurylenko and Mila Kunis.

Government and civil bodies concerned
This sphere is administrated by the Ministry of Culture of Ukraine and the Ukrainian Association of Cinematographers.

The central executive body of cinematography in Ukraine is the Ukrainian State Film Agency (USFA). Together with the Ukrainian Cultural Foundation, it is the largest investor in Ukrainian cinema and as of 2019 each of these institutions is investing about UAH 500 million in Ukrainian film production.

Film studios

State owned
 Dovzhenko Film Studios (Kyiv)
 Kyivnaukfilm (Kyiv)
 National Cinematheque of Ukraine (former part of Kyivnaukfilm) (Kyiv)
 Odesa Film Studio (Odesa)
 Ukranimafilm (former part of Kyivnaukfilm) (Kyiv)
 Ukrtelefilm (Kyiv)
 Yalta Film Studio (Yalta)

Privately owned
 Animagrad (Kyiv)
 Film Service Illuminator
 Film.UA (Kyiv)
 Fresh Production
 Halychyna-Film Film Studio (Lviv)
 Interfilm Production Studio
 Kinofabryka
 Odesa Animation Studio (Odesa)
 Panama Grand Prix (Kyiv)
 Patriot Film
 Pronto Film (Kyiv)
 Star Media
 Yalta-Film Film Studio (Yalta)

Film distribution
B&H Film Distribution Company is a major Ukrainian film distributor; it is the local distributor of films by Walt Disney Pictures, Universal Pictures, Paramount Pictures, Sony Pictures Entertainment (Columbia Pictures).

Ukrainian Film Distribution (formerly Gemini Ukraine) is the local distributor of films by 20th Century Fox (Fox Searchlight Pictures, Blue Sky Studios).

VLG.FILM (formerly Volga Ukraine) is the local distributor of films by Miramax, StudioCanal, STX Entertainment, A24, Lionsgate, Focus Features International, EuropaCorp, Pathé Exchange, Kinology, Affinity Equity Partners, Exclusive Media Group, TF1 and others.

Kinomania is the local distributor of films by Warner Brothers (New Line Cinema).

Short films, festival winners and art house are mostly distributed by Arthouse traffic.

The newest website database system for the artists is the Ukrainian Film Industry Foundation

Festivals

Molodist, Kyiv International Film Festival, held in Kyiv (1970-)
Kyiv International Film Festival (KIFF), held in Kyiv (2009-)
Kyiv International Short Film Festival (KISFF), held in Kyiv (2012-)
Kinolev, held in Lviv (2006-)
Odesa International Film Festival, held in Odesa (2010-)
Animation Film Festival "Krok", (1987) organized by the Ukrainian Association of Cinematographers and takes place in Ukraine and Russia
Pokrov, international festival of Christian Orthodox cinema, held in Kyiv (2003-)
Vidkryta Nich (Open Night), festival of Ukrainian debut short films, held in Kyiv (1997-)
Kharkiv Siren Film Festival, international festival of short feature films, held in Kharkiv (2008-)
Wiz-Art, International Short Film Festival, held in Lviv (2008-)
VAU-Fest, International Video Art and Short Film Festival, held in the town of Ukrainka in Kyiv oblast (2010-)
Kinofront, festival of Ukrainian Z and indie movies (2008-)
Docudays UA, international human rights documentary film festival, held in Kyiv with traveling programs around Ukraine (2003-)
Contact, international documentary film festival, held in Kyiv (2005-2007)
Berdiansk International Film Festival "Golden Brigantine", festival of cinema made in Commonwealth of Independent States and Baltic countries, held in the city of Berdiansk (2011)
Irpin Film Festival, International noncommercial festival of alternative cinema, held in the town of Irpin (2003)
Golden Pektorale, International Truskavets Film Festival, held in the town of Truskavets
Crown of Carpathians, Another International Truskavets Film Festival, held in the town of Truskavets
Mute Nights, Odesa, International silent film festival which is held in Odesa on the third week on June.
Kino-Yalta, festival of producer's cinema (2003) organized together with the Russian government
Stozhary, held in Kyiv (1995-2005)
Sebastopol International Film Festival, held in Sevastopol, Crimea (2005-2009, 2011)

Awards

Current awards

Shevchenko National Prize, for the Performing Arts
Dovzhenko State Prize of Ukraine
Scythian deer, the main prize of the International Student Cinematography Festival Molodist
Golden Dzyga (Ukrainian Film Academy Awards), the main prize of the Odesa International Film Festival (OIFF)
Sunny bunny of the international student cinematography festival Molodist
Ukrainian Panorama of the international student cinematography festival Molodist

In 1987, Ukrainian engineer and animator Eugene Mamut together with three colleagues won the Oscar (Scientific and Engineering Award) for the design and development of RGA / Oxberry Compu-Quad Special Effects Optical Printer for the movie Predator.

In 2006, Ukrainian engineer and inventor Anatoliy Kokush was awarded two Oscars for the concept and development of the Ukrainian Arm gyro-stabilized camera crane and the Flight Head.

Former awards
Lenin Komsomol Prize of Ukrainian SSR

Notable films

 1910 Шемелько-денщик або Хохол наплутав / Shemelko-Denshchyk, directed by Oleksandr Ostroukhov-Arbo
 1912 Запорізька січ / Zaporizhian Sich, directed by Danylo Sakhnenko
 1912 Любов Андрія / Andriy's Love, directed by Danylo Sakhnenko
 1913 Полтава / Poltava, directed by Danylo Sakhnenko
 1926 Ягідка кохання / Love's Berries, directed by Oleksandr Dovzhenko (silent film)
 1926 Тарас Шевченко/ Taras Shevchenko, directed by Pyotr Chardynin
 1926 Тарас Трясило / Taras Triasylo, directed by Pyotr Chardynin
 1928 Арсенал / Arsenal, directed by Oleksandr Dovzhenko (silent film)
 1928 Звенигора / Zvenyhora, directed by Oleksandr Dovzhenko (silent film)
 1928 Шкурник / Leather-man, directed by Mykola Shpykovsky (silent film)
 1928 Одинадцятий /The Eleventh Year, directed by Dziga Vertov (documentary film)
 1929 Людина з кіноапаратом / Man with a Movie Camera, directed by Dziga Vertov (documentary film)
 1930 Ентузіазм (Симфонія Донбасу)/ Enthusiasm, directed by Dziga Vertov (first Ukrainian documentary sound film)
 1930 Земля / Earth, directed by Oleksandr Dovzhenko (silent film)
 1932 Іван / Ivan, directed by Oleksandr Dovzhenko (silent film)
 1932 Коліївщина / Koliyivshchyna, directed by Ivan Kavaleridze
 1935 Аероград / Aerograd, directed by Oleksandr Dovzhenko (sci-fi)
 1936 Наталка Полтавка / Natalka Poltavka, directed by Ivan Kavaleridze
 1939 Щорс / Shchors, directed by Oleksandr Dovzhenko (documentary film)
 1941 Богдан Хмельницький / Bohdan Khmelnytsky, directed by Ihor Savchenko
 1943 Битва за нашу Радянську Україну / Battle for Soviet Ukraine, directed by Oleksandr Dovzhenko 
 1947 Подвиг розвідника / Secret Agent, directed by Borys Barnet
 1951 Тарас Шевченко / Taras Shevchenko, directed by Ihor Savchenko
 1952 В степах України / In the Steppes of Ukraine, directed by Tymofiy Levchuk
 1952 Украдене щастя / Stolen Happiness, directed by Hnat Yura (by the drama of Ivan Franko)
 1953 Мартин Боруля / Martyn Borulia, directed by Oleksiy Shvachko
 1955 Іван Франко / Ivan Franko, directed by Tymofiy Levchuk
 1959 Григорій Сковорода / Hryhoriy Shovoroda, directed by Ivan Kavaleridze
 1960 Наталія Ужвій / Nataliya Uzhviy, directed by Serhiy Paradzhanov
 1961 За двома зайцями / Chasing Two Hares, directed by Viktor Ivanov (by the play of Mykhailo Starytsky)
 1962 Квітка на камені (Ніхто так не кохав) / Flower on the Stone, directed by Serhiy Paradzhanov
 1963 Королева бензоколонки / Queen of the Gas Station, directed by Mykola Litus and Oleksiy Mishurin
 1964 Тіні забутих предків / Shadows of Forgotten Ancestors, directed by Serhiy Paradzhanov
 1964 Сон / The Dream, directed by Volodymyr Denysenko
 1965 Гадюка / The Viper, directed by Viktor Ivchenko
 1965 Криниця для спраглих / Well for thirsty, directed by Yuriy Illienko
 1966 Соловей із села Маршинці / Nightingale from the Village of Marshyntsi, directed by Rostyslav Synko (musical featuring Sofia Rotaru)
 1967 Київські мелодії / Kyiv Melodies, directed by Ihor Samborskyi 
 1968 Анничка / Annychka, directed by Borys Ivchenko
 1968 Камінний хрест / Stone cross, directed by Leonid Osyka (by the novels of Vasyl Stefanyk)
 1969 Ми з України / We are from Ukraine, directed by Vasyl Illiashenko
 1970 Білий птах з чорною ознакою / White Bird with Black Mark, directed by Yuriy Illienko
 1971 Захар Беркут / Zakhar Berkut, directed by Leonid Osyka (by the story of Ivan Franko)
 1971 Червона рута / Chervona Ruta, directed by Roman Oleksiv (musical featuring Sofia Rotaru and Vasyl Zinkevych)
 1972 Пропала Грамота / The Lost Letter, directed by Borys Ivchenko
 1973 У бій ідуть лише «старі» / Only Old Men are Going to Battle, directed by Leonid Bykov
 1974 Марина / Maryna, directed by Borys Ivchenko
 1975 Пісня завжди з нами / Song is Always with Us, directed by Viktor Storozhenko (musical featuring Sofia Rotaru)
 1976 Ати-бати, йшли солдати... / Aty-baty, Soldiers were Going..., directed by Leonid Bykov
 1976 Тривожний місяць вересень / The Troubled Month of Veresen, directed by Leonid Osyka
 1977 Весь світ в очах твоїх... / All the World is in Your Eyes, directed by Stanislav Klymenko
 1978 Море / Sea, directed by Leonid Osyka
 1979 Дударики / Dudaryky, directed by Stanislav Klymenko
 1979 Вавілон XX / Babylon XX, directed by Ivan Mykolaichuk
 1980 Чорна курка, або Підземні жителі / Black Chicken or the Underground Inhabitants, directed by Viktor Hres
 1981 Така пізня, така тепла осінь / Such Late, Such Warm Autumn, directed by Ivan Mykolaichuk
 1982 Повернення Баттерфляй / The Return of the Butterfly, directed by Oleh Fialko
 1983 Колесо історії / Wheel of History, directed by Stanislav Klymenko
 1983 Вир / Whirlpool, directed by Stanislav Klymenko
 1984 Украдене щастя / Stolen Happiness, directed by Yuriy Tkachenko (by the drama of Ivan Franko)
 1985 Вклонись до землі / Earth-reaching Bowing, directed by Leonid Osyka
 1986 І в звуках пам'ять відгукнеться... / And Memory Will Recall in the Sounds..., directed by Tymofiy Levchuk
 1987 Данило — князь Галицький / Danylo — Kniaz of Halychyna, directed by Yaroslav Lupiy
 1988 Чорна Долина / Black Valley, directed by Halyna Horpynchenko
 1989 Небилиці про Івана / Fables about Ivan, directed by Borys Ivchenko
 1989 Камінна душа / Stone Soul, directed by Stanislav Klymenko
 1989 В Далеку Путь / Taking Off, directed by Oles Yanchuk (short film)
 1991 Голод-33 / Famine-33, directed by Oles Yanchuk
 1991 Чудо в краю забуття / Miracle in the Land of Oblivion, directed by Natalia Motuzko
 1992 Тарас Шевченко. Заповіт / Taras Shevchenko. Testament, directed by Stanislav Klymenko
 1993 Гетьманські клейноди / Hetman's Regalia, directed by Leonid Osyka
 1993 Сад Гетсиманський / Garden of Gethsemane, directed by Rostyslav Synko (by the novel of Ivan Bahriany)
 1994 Тигролови / Tiger Catchers, directed by Rostyslav Synko (by the novel of Ivan Bahriany)
 1995 Атентат - осіннє вбивство в Мюнхені / Assassination. An Autumn Murder in Munich, directed by Oles Yanchuk
 1995 Москаль-чарівник / Moskal-Charivnyk, directed by Mykola Zasieiev-Rudenko
 1997 Приятель небіжчика / A Friend of the Deceased, directed by Viacheslav Kryshtofovych
 1998 Тупик / Dead End, directed by Hryhoriy Kokhan
 1999 Як коваль щастя шукав / How the Blacksmith Looked for Happiness, directed by Radomyr Vasylevsky
 2000 Нескорений / The Undefeated, directed by Oles Yanchuk
 2001 Молитва за гетьмана Мазепу / Prayer for Hetman Mazepa, directed by Yuriy Illienko
 2002 Чорна Рада / Chorna Rada, directed by Mykola Zasieiev-Rudenko
 2003 Мамай / Mamay, directed by Oles Sanin
 2004 Водій для Віри / A Driver for Vira, directed by Pavlo Chukhrai
 2004 Залізна сотня / The Company of Heroes, directed by Oles Yanchuk
 2004 Украдене щастя / Stolen Happiness, directed by Andriy Donchyk (by the drama of Ivan Franko)
 2004 Між Гітлером і Сталіном — Україна в II Світовій війні / Between Hitler and Stalin, directed by Sviatoslav Novytsky (documentary film)
 2005 День Сьомий. Півтори Години У Стані Громадянської Війни / Day Seven, directed by Oles Sanin (documentary film)
 2005 Дрібний Дощ / Drizzle, directed by Heorhiy Deliyev (short film)
 2005 Помаранчеве небо / The Orange Sky, directed by Oleksandr Kiriyenko
 2006 Собор на крові / Sobor on the Blood, directed by Ihor Kobryn (documentary film)
 2006 Музей Степана Бандери У Лондоні / Stepan Bandera Museum In London, directed by Oles Yanchuk (documentary film)
 2006 Аврора / Aurora, directed by Oksana Bairak
 2007 Богдан-Зиновій Хмельницький / Bohdan-Zynoviy Khmelnytskyi, directed by Mykola Mashchenko
 2008 Сафо. Кохання без меж / Sappho. Love without Limits, directed by Robert Crombie
 2008 Владика Андрей / Metropolitan Andrey, directed by Oles Yanchuk
 2008 Ілюзія страху / Illusion of Fear, directed by Oleksandr Kiriyenko
 2008 Меніни / Las Meninas, directed by Ihor Podolchak
 2010 Щастя моє / My Joy, directed by Serhiy Loznytsia
 2011 Вона заплатила життям / She Paid the Ultimate Price, directed by Iryna Korpan (documentary film)
 2011 Той, хто пройшов крізь вогонь / Firecrosser, directed by Mykhailo Illienko
 2011 Легка, як пір'їнка / Feathered Dreams, directed by Andriy Rozhen
 2012 Деліріум / Delirium, directed by Ihor Podolchak
 2012 Хайтарма / Haytarma, directed by Akhtem Seitablaiev
 2013 Параджанов / Paradjanov, directed by Serge Avedikian and Olena Fetisova
 2013 Брати. Остання сповідь / Brothers. The final confession, directed by Viktoriya Trofimenko
 2014 Плем'я / The Tribe, directed by Myroslav Slaboshpytskyi
 2014 Поводир / The Guide, directed by Oles Sanin
 2014 Майдан / Maidan, directed by Serhiy Loznytsia (documentary film)
 2015 Зима у вогні: Боротьба України за свободу / Winter on Fire: Ukraine's Fight for Freedom, directed by Yevhen Afinieievskyi (documentary film)
 2015 Незламна / Indestructable, directed by Serhiy Mokrytskyi
 2017 Кiборги: Герої не вмирають  / Cyborgs: Heroes Never Die, directed by Akhtem Seitablayev
 2019 Мої думки тихі / My Thoughts Are Silent, directed by Antonio Lukich
 2021 Носоріг / Rhino, directed by Oleh Sentsov

Top awards

Film dubbing or subtitling in Ukrainian 
Film dubbing or subtitling in Ukrainian refers to the dubbing or subtitles of video products (movies, TV series, video games, etc.) in Ukrainian.

In 2010, one third of all films in Ukraine were Russian language subbed. In 2019, a law was passed by the Ukrainian parliament assuring that all movies have dubbing or subtitles in the Ukrainian language. In 2021, Netflix released their first feature film with Ukrainian dubbing. Only 11% of Ukrainians oppose dubbing in films.

Ukrainian dubbing actors 
Since the founding of a Ukrainian dubbing in 2006 there was many recognizable voice actors dubbing Ukrainian, among which the most famous are Eugene Maluha (known as the voice of the Ukrainian Alfa from the same cult series) and Yuri Kovalenko (known as Ukrainian cheesecakes voice in the movie Cars - first full-length animated film-blockbuster, which was shown in Ukrainian cinemas with Ukrainian dubbing).

Ukrainian show business stars are also actively involved in dubbing in Ukrainian. A number of famous singers, including Oleg Skrypka and Ani Lorak, took part in the dubbing of the animated film Carlson, who lives on the roof (2002) . A number of celebrities worked on the cartoon Terkel and Khalepa (2004): Potap, Oleg Skrypka, Fagot and Fozzy (TNMK band), Foma (Mandry band), Vadim Krasnooky (Mad Heads band), Katya Chilly, Vitaliy Kozlovsky, Lilu, Vasya Gontarsky ("Vasya Club"), DJ Romeo and Stepan Kazanin (Quarter-95). In the cartoon Horton (2008) you can hear the voices of showmen Pavel Shilko (DJ Pasha) and Volodymyr Zelenskyy (Quarter-9). The main characters of the film "13th District: Ultimatum" (2009) in the Ukrainian box office spoke in the voices of Yevhen Koshov (Quarter-95) and Andriy Khlyvnyuk (soloist of the group "Boombox").

Actors

Ukrainian actors
 Bohdan Kozak (November 27, 1940)
 Ivan Mykolaichuk (June 15, 1941 – August 3, 1987)
 Bohdan Stupka (August 27, 1941 – July 22, 2012)
 Rayisa Nedashkivska (February 17, 1943)
 Mykhailo Holubovych (November 27, 1940)
 Ivan Havryliuk (October 25, 1948)
 Serhiy Romaniuk (July 21, 1953)
 Bohdan Beniuk (May 26, 1957)
 Ruslana Pysanka (November 17, 1965 - 19 July 2022)
 Taisia Povaliy (December 10, 1965)

Ukrainian diaspora actors
 Vira Kholodna (1893-1919)
 Gregory Hlady (December 4, 1954)
 David Vadim (March 28, 1972)
 Eugene Hütz (September 6, 1972)
 Oleg Prudius (April 27, 1972)
 Vera Farmiga (August 6, 1973)
 Milla Jovovich (December 17, 1975)
 Katheryn Winnick (December 17, 1977)
 Olga Kurylenko (November 14, 1979)
 Mila Kunis (August 14, 1983)

Immigrants from Ukraine were the parents or grandparents of Serge Gainsbourg, Leonard Nimoy, Vira Farmiga, Taissa Farmiga, Steven Spielberg, Dustin Hoffman, Sylvester Stallone, Kirk Douglas, Leonardo DiCaprio, Winona Ryder, Whoopi Goldberg, Edward Dmytryk, Lenny Kravitz and Zoë Kravitz, illusionist David Copperfield, animator Bill Tytla.

Directors

Ukrainian directors
 Oleksandr Dovzhenko ( – November 25, 1956)
 Viktor Ivchenko (November 4, 1912 — November 6, 1972)
 Leonid Bykov (December 12, 1928 – April 11, 1979)
 Mykola Mashchenko (January 2, 1929 — May 2, 2013)
 Vadym Illienko (July 3, 1932 — May 8, 2015)
 Yuriy Illienko (July 16, 1936 - June 15, 2010)
 Leonid Osyka (March 8, 1940 - September 16, 2001)
 Mykhailo Illienko (June 29, 1947)
 Andriy Donchyk (September 11, 1961)
 Ihor Podolchak (April 9, 1962)
 Myroslav Slaboshpytskyi (October 17, 1974)
Vyacheslav Krishtofovich
Sergiy Masloboyschikov
Maryna Vroda

Non-Ukrainian origin directors
 Dziga Vertov (2 January 1896 – 12 February 1954)
 Anatole Litvak (May 10, 1902 – December 15, 1974)
 Sergei Bondarchuk (September 25, 1920 – October 20, 1994)
 Grigori Chukhrai (May 23, 1921 – October 28, 2001)
 Sergei Parajanov (January 9, 1924 – July 20, 1990)
 Kira Muratova (November 5, 1934)
 Larisa Shepitko (6 January 1938 – 2 June 1979)
 Roman Balayan (April 15, 1941)
 Sergei Loznitsa (September 5, 1964)

See also
 Cinema of the world
 National Oleksandr Dovzhenko Film Centre
 Ukrainian Association of Cinematographers
 Ukrainian poetic cinema
 Ukrainian Film Academy
 Golden Dzyga
 Ptakh Jung
 History of Ukrainian animation

References

External links
 Ukrainian Film Club at Columbia University
 Ukrainian cinema
 (Notable films and awards)
 Lviv Film Commission
 Ukraіnian Film Commіssion
 Ukraіnian Cinema Foundation
 Ukrainian cinema rises from the ashes
 Defining and Exploring Ukrainian Cinema
 International Film Guide. Ukraine
 Scenes of belonging: cinema and the nationality question in Soviet Ukraine during the long 1960s
 History of Cinema in UKRAINE
 Kyiv National I. K. Karpenko-Kary Theatre, Cinema and Television University
 Ukrainian indie films portal
 Cinemahall, International organization for informal film education
 "Film" entry in Historical Dictionary of Ukraine, Ivan Katchanovski, Zenon E. Kohut, Bohdan Y. Nebesio, Myroslav Yurkevich, Scarecrow Press, 2013. 

 
Ukrainian culture
Arts in Ukraine
Entertainment in Ukraine
History of Ukrainian cinema
Industry in Ukraine
European cinema by country